Equalize is the third album by the UK band Swami, released on 24 September 2007.

Track listing

 "Hey Hey" (featuring Boostylz)
 "Electro Jugni"
 "Intoxicated" (featuring Lady Ru)
 "Ching" (featuring Spee)
 "Pushin'" (featuring Pras Michel and Ishmael)
 "Shakedown" (featuring El Feco)
 "Break" (featuring Ishmael)
 "Can't Let Go" (featuring Errol Reid and Yam Boy)
 "Give It What U Got" (featuring A Suivre)
 "In Your Eyes" (featuring Sonia Panesar)

Reviews

Review by BBC Radio 1 DJ Bobby Friction
Review by BBC Radio 1 DJ Nihal
BBC Music Review
Asian Woman Magazine Review

References

External links
 Official Swami Website

2007 albums
Swami (band) albums